Verónica Rodríguez Fiño (born 1 August 1991) is a Venezuelan pornographic actress, model, and singer.

Early life 
Rodriguez Fino was born on 1 August 1991 in the Venezuelan city of Maracay, capital of the Atanasio Girardot municipality and the state of Aragua. She has a younger sister, Katya, who is also a pornographic actress. She was educated in a private Catholic school where the students were separated by gender. Her parents divorced when she was eight years old and she moved with her mother to the United States, where she lived in Chicago, Illinois for four years and later in Miami, Florida.

Career 
Prior to entering the pornographic industry, Rodriguez worked as a sales clerk in a Miami mall. Her first porn internship came when she made a cameo as an extra in a production. This allowed her to get in contact with producers in the industry who asked her if she was interested in working full-time in the industry.

Rodriguez made her debut as a pornographic actress in 2011 when she was 20 years old, with her first scene being for Bang Bros studios. She has worked for production companies such as Naughty America, Pure Play Media, Evil Angel, 3rd Degree, Brazzers, Hustler, Girlsway, Devil's Film, Vixen, New Sensations, Digital Playground, Reality Kings, Elegant Angel, Girlfriends Films, and Wicked, among others.

Rodriguez has had a stable presence since 2014 in the industry awards circuit, mainly the AVN Awards and the XBIZ Awards. Of all the nominations she received, the categories she's been the most nominated were for Best Lesbian Sex Scene, Best Lesbian Group Sex Scene, or Best M-H-M Threesome Scene. In 2015, at the XBIZ Awards, she was nominated for Female Artist of the Year and Best Supporting Actress for Apocalypse X.

As an actress, Rodriguez has appeared in more than 380 films. She has also released music, with one of her songs being titled "Hola" and another song titled "Mala" which features vocals from Lil Pump. Some of her works include Amateur Assault, Cuties 6, Evil Squirters 2, Glamour Girls 4, Kendra's Angels,  Latina Squirt Goddess, Naughty Athletics 21, Oil Overload 11,  Panty Raid, and Sweet Petite.

Awards and nominations

References

External links 
 
 
 
 

Living people
1991 births
People from Maracay
Female adult models
Venezuelan female models
Venezuelan pornographic film actresses
Venezuelan emigrants to the United States